Cycling for transport and leisure enjoys popularity in Greater Manchester and the city also plays a major role in British cycle racing. The University of Manchester is home to the Manchester Cycling Lab.

Since 2014, Manchester has been upgrading many key thoroughfares into the city centre to include dedicated cycle lanes which are segregated from buses including Oxford Road.

Utility cycling

Cycling is a significant mode of transport for people commuting to work. In 2011, the UK Census revealed that 2.1% of residents travelled to work by bike in Greater Manchester, up from 1.9% in 2001.

Transport for Greater Manchester aspire to "achieve at least a 300% increase in the levels of cycling across the city region by 2025" and have produced a corresponding cycling strategy.

Greater Manchester Cycling Campaign is a volunteer-run group that works to make cycling quicker, safer and more enjoyable. Another pressure group for Greater Manchester is Walk Ride GM, which advocates for better environments and facilities for pedestrians as well as cyclists.

The Manchester Cycle Forum enables people with an interest in cycling to meet councillors and council staff from Manchester City Council, Transport for Greater Manchester staff, and representatives from various cycling and transport organisations to discuss cycling-related issues in the city. Meetings take place quarterly.

Manchester Friends of the Earth coordinate the 'Love Your Bike' campaign, which promotes cycling as an environmentally friendly mode of transport. One of its activities is the 'Bike Friday' scheme, monthly rides from outer districts into the city centre. These are aimed at encouraging commuters to cycle in to work, benefiting from the added safety and sociability of riding in a group.

In 2015, Manchester was described as a "terrible cycling city" by Helen Pidd, the North of England editor of the Guardian newspaper.

Chris Boardman was appointed Cycling and Walking Commissioner for Greater Manchester in 2017 by mayor Andy Burnham. His remit includes overseeing projects to enhance the region's cycling network and increase the number of people who travel by bike.
He was replaced by Dame Sarah Storey in 2022

Bicycle hire 
In June 2017 Mobike started a bicycle-sharing scheme across the city allowing users to hire bikes via its app. Riders paid a deposit and were then charged 50p per 30 minutes. The scheme was suspended in September 2018 due to the high level of vandalism caused to many of the bicycles.

A 2013 study by TfGM into the possibility of a bike hire scheme had suggested that an initial scheme should focus on a concentrated portion at the centre of the conurbation, including Manchester city centre, Salford Quays, Oxford Road and Hulme.

The new docked bike hire scheme, started in November 2021 as a public trial with 250 cycles on Oxford Road. By the summer of 2022 they plan to have 1,500 (1200 Pedal bikes and 300 e-bikes) bikes across Manchester, Trafford & Salford. The scheme wil have 200 docking stations with around 198,000 residents with in a 5 minute walk, with docking stations roughly 300-500 meters apart. The cycles will be hired using an app, they are GPS tracked, accessible and adaptable with automatic lighting. It works on a PAYR (Pay as you ride) basis. When it launches me Mechanical hire cycles will cost 50p to unlock and 5p per minute, The E-bike will cost £1 to unlock and 10p per minute to ride.

The city was the first to get a "Brompton Bike Hire" facility, at Piccadilly station.

Cycle Hubs 
A Cycle Hub is a safe and secure place to lock bikes under cover, away from potential thieves. Protected by CCTV and a swipe-card entry systems, there are Cycle Hubs near public transport links and other convenient places across Greater Manchester. There are currently 14 locations across Greater Manchester. It costs £10 per year to access all locations, except MediaCity UK and City Tower which both have individual subscriptions. This is Managed by TfGM.

The Bee Network 
The Bee Network is a project launched by TfGM with the aim to connect up every area and community in Greater Manchester, making it easy, safe and attractive for people to travel on foot or by bike for everyday trips. A large focus is being put on to cycling in this project, therefore TfGM are investing money in many things that encourage cycling such as the upcoming Cycle hire scheme, Cycle hubs and many courses to help people learn to ride a bike.

Cycle routes

Major dedicated cycle routes in Greater Manchester or passing through areas of the city include the Trans Pennine Trail, National Cycle Route 6, National Cycle Route 55, National Cycle Route 66, the Fallowfield Loop and Regional Cycle Route 86.

Significant work to improve cycle lanes on Oxford Road and its continuation Wilmslow Road started in early 2016. The route is a major artery for buses between the residential areas of south Manchester and the city centre, and bisects the main Manchester University campus. Much of the cycleway is now physically separated from vehicle traffic. A pair of digital bicycle counters installed on either side of the road near Whitworth Park in September 2016 had reached a combined total of 1,000,000 bike journeys by late 2017.

In 2019, TfGM is developing a "Bee Network" of cycle routes across Greater Manchester.

The 1st part of the Chorlton Cycleway has been delivered with Dutch style junctions.

Regular events
The Manchester Sky Ride, a mass participation bike ride, was held in August every year, and became the HSBC UK City Ride from July 2017. The Great Manchester Cycle is a similar large-scale event held during the summer in recent years.
A Critical Mass event takes place on the last Friday of every month, starting by Manchester Central Library. A naked bike ride is held annually early in the summer, along with a non-corporate DIY cycling festival, North West Velofest.

There are over 200 cycle clubs in Greater Manchester, catering to many styles of cycling, with Manchester Wheelers' Club being one of the most well-known.

Well known sportives include the "Manchester 100", a choice of 100 mile or 100 km rides to the south of the city, and the "Tour de Manc", a 100-mile ride through all the ten boroughs.

Cycle racing
Manchester is prominent in elite cycling, being home to British Cycling, the governing body for cycle racing in Great Britain, and the National Cycling Centre. The centre was built in 1994 and contains Britain's first indoor cycling track, which has hosted three UCI Track Cycling World Championships, among many other events. The National Indoor BMX Arena is situated alongside the velodrome. The country's foremost professional cycling team, Team Ineos, is also headquartered at the National Cycling Centre.

History
A combined velodrome and athletics stadium, Fallowfield Stadium opened in 1892. The cycling track was 509 yards in circumference and was used for the 1934 British Empire Games. It was demolished in 1994.

See also 

 Bee Network

References

External links

 
Transport in Manchester
Manchester